Hurricane Erika was the strongest and longest-lasting tropical cyclone in the 1997 Atlantic hurricane season. It developed from a tropical wave on September 3 and moved west-northwestward across the tropical Atlantic Ocean, steadily intensifying until it attained hurricane status on September 4, becoming the fifth named storm and third hurricane of the season. Erika passed a short distance to the north of the Lesser Antilles, and later turned to the north in response to an approaching trough. It turned to the east, weakened to a tropical storm, and became extratropical after passing near the Azores archipelago.

The hurricane produced light rainfall and winds throughout the northern Lesser Antilles. The passage of Erika carried a cloud of volcanic ash to Antigua from the eruption of the Soufrière Hills Volcano on Montserrat, a rare occurrence. Strong waves from the hurricane produced beach erosion and coastal flooding in northern Puerto Rico, and caused the death of two surfers. Moderate wind gusts in the northern Leeward Islands and Puerto Rico left thousands of residents without power, and resulted in $10 million (1997 USD, $12.6 million 2006 USD) in damage in the U.S. Caribbean territories. Erika also produced gusty winds and light rain in the Azores. Erika was the only tropical cyclone in the Atlantic Ocean in the months of August and September, the first occurrence of such event in an Atlantic hurricane season since 1929.

Meteorological history

A large tropical wave, which eventually became Erika, moved off the coast of Africa on August 31. Shortly after leaving the coast, it displayed a large low-level circulation, though as it tracked westward, the circulation failed to contract significantly. The depression moved west-northwestward at approximately  under the influence of a well-established subtropical ridge, and late on September 3 the system intensified into a tropical storm. At that time, the National Hurricane Center in Miami gave the storm the name of Erika.

Erika continued to the west-northwest, and in the early hours of September 4, an eye-like feature appeared to have developed in the center of the deep convection. The feature was not an eye, though, as visible satellite imagery revealed a center partially exposed from the convection. Deep convection re-developed near the center, and the hurricane slowly strengthened as it continued west-northwestward. Hurricane Erika decelerated its forward motion as it approached the Lesser Antilles, and passed within  of the islands as a Category 1 hurricane. An approaching trough weakened the subtropical ridge, resulting in Erika turning to the north and later to the northeast. Erika maintained peak intensity for about 24 hours before weakening over cooler waters.

Increased upper-level wind shear weakened the hurricane to a tropical storm on September 12. Erika continued to weaken as it turned to the east-southeast, though it maintained deep convection near the center despite unfavorable atmospheric conditions. On September 15 Erika passed near the western Azores islands, and quickly weakened as deep convection diminished.

Preparations

Early in the storm's development, forecasting Erika's motion was difficult, with a persistent leftward bias in official forecasts. In response to Erika's threat, the government of Saint Martin first issued a tropical storm warning late on September 4. The next day, the respective governments of Antigua, Montserrat, Barbuda, Saint Kitts and Nevis, Anguilla, Dominica, Guadeloupe, and Saint Barthélemy issued tropical storm warnings for their islands. When Erika's motion resulted in a path that would take it closer to the islands, all of the aforementioned islands excluding Guadeloupe upgraded the tropical storm warning to a hurricane warning. In addition, a hurricane watch was issued for the British and United States Virgin Islands, as well as Puerto Rico. In public advisories, the National Hurricane Center stated tropical storm conditions were likely to be experienced in the Azores. Early forecasts anticipated a threat to the island of Bermuda.

The governments of the islands in the predicted path of Erika urged residents to quickly prepare for the hurricane through radio addresses. In the wake of busy seasons in 1995 and 1996, which some islands were still recovering from, emergency preparations began. In Puerto Rico, fishermen secured their boats in preparation for the storm. Also on the island, citizens formed long lines at gas stations and purchased emergency supplies. Officials in Anguilla enacted a plan that would turn off the island's power supply if the winds exceeded . As a precaution, authorities on Saint Martin enacted a curfew for all but those in service jobs.

Impact
Hurricane Erika produced strong waves and high low-level winds throughout the Lesser Antilles. Just weeks after the eruption of the Soufrière Hills Volcano on Montserrat, the storm blew a cloud of falling ash over Antigua. Tropical storm-force winds affected several of the islands in the Lesser Antilles.

The precipitation produced localized street flooding, while the combination of winds and rain caused power interruptions. Offshore, strong waves capsized one dinghy and broke a  boat from its moorings. The wind gusts downed a few power lines, and damage was minor.

The wind gusts snapped tree branches into power lines, leaving up to 12,000 people without power in San Juan, Guaynabo and Bayamón. One road was closed when sections of it were flooded or washed out. The strong waves forced the evacuation of eight families in the northern portion of the island. The strong waves killed two surfers in the northeastern waters of the island. Damage in Puerto Rico and the U.S. Virgin Islands totaled to $10 million (1997 USD, $12.6 million 2006 USD) in a preliminary estimate.

Thirty-one ships encountered Erika from September 4, when it was a tropical storm, to September 18, when it was extratropical. Damage, if any, is unknown in the Azores.

See also

 Hurricane Fabian
 Hurricane Igor
 Hurricane Gonzalo
 List of Azores hurricanes

References

External links

 Hurricane Erika Tropical Cyclone Report

1997 Atlantic hurricane season
Erika (1997)
Category 3 Atlantic hurricanes
Hurricanes in the Leeward Islands
Hurricanes in the British Virgin Islands
Hurricanes in the Azores